James McQuaid Boo (born November 12, 1954) is an American former ice hockey defenseman. He played 6 games in the National Hockey League with the Minnesota North Stars during the 1977–78 season. The rest of his career, which lasted from 1978 to 1980, was spent in the Central Hockey League.

Career 
Although he was born in Missouri, Boo grew up in Mahtomedi, Minnesota. Boo played junior hockey for the Mahtomedi High School team before joining the University of Minnesota Golden Gophers. He was part of the team that won the 1976 NCAA Men's Ice Hockey Championship.

The Minnesota North Stars of the National Hockey League signed Boo to a free-agent contract during the 1977–78 season. He played six games for the team. For the next two seasons, Boo played for the Central Hockey League Oklahoma City Stars. He retired from ice hockey following the 1980 season.

After his hockey career ended, Boo began working in the real estate industry, eventually forming his own company, Team Boo Realty with his wife, Tracy. Boo is also involved with High Pointe Realty, another Minnesota-based real estate firm.

Career statistics

Regular season and playoffs

External links
 

1954 births
Living people
American men's ice hockey defensemen
Fort Worth Texans players
Ice hockey players from Minnesota
Ice hockey people from Missouri
Minnesota Golden Gophers men's ice hockey players
Minnesota North Stars players
NCAA men's ice hockey national champions
Oklahoma City Stars players
People from Rolla, Missouri
People from Mahtomedi, Minnesota
Undrafted National Hockey League players